Chom Phra is a district (amphoe) in the northern part of Surin province, northeastern Thailand.

Geography
Neighboring districts are (from the north clockwise): Tha Tum, Sanom, Sikhoraphum, Khwao Sinarin and Mueang Surin of Surin Province; and Satuek of Buriram province.

History
The minor district (king amphoe) Chom Phra was established in 1959, when it was split off from Tha Tum district. On 27 July 1965 it was upgraded to a full district.

Administration
The district is divided into nine sub-districts (tambons), which are further subdivided into 105 villages (mubans). Chom Phra is a township (thesaban tambon) which covers parts of tambon Chom Phra. There are a further nine tambon administrative organizations (TAO).

Chom Phra